Laureen Oliver is a US politician who co-founded the New York State Independence Party.

Career
In 1992, Oliver co-founded the New York State Independence Party with B. Thomas Golisano. Prior to the Independence Party, Oliver served as the Monroe County Chairwoman of United We Stand America.

Oliver served as Founding State Chairwoman of the Independence Party from 1993 to 1998. As Founding State Chairwoman, she organized the state party in almost all the counties in the state.  Under her tenure, the party grew from nothing to one of the most successful and largest third parties in the country.  The Independence Party was a fiscally conservative and socially moderate political party.

She also served as Tom Golisano's Campaign Chairwoman in his 1994, 1998 and 2002 gubernatorial bids. In 2002, Golisano's bid for governor of New York was ranked as the most expensive race in the U.S. and Golisano being the leader in the most personally-funded U.S.campaigns.  Golisano spent almost $85 million of his own money.

She also served as a national delegate to the Reform Party and was fundamentally responsible for the Reform Party gaining recognition by the Federal Election Commission. She is widely recognized for being the most named person in election lawsuits in the United States.

After leaving the state, she went on to serve in campaigns in numerous other states as a ballot access expert. Today she is still considered one the country's most informed ballot access experts.

In 1994, she was the party's nominee for comptroller of New York State. In 1998, she was the running mate of B. Thomas Golisano for lieutenant governor. The Golisano/Oliver ticket finished third, behind the Republican ticket of Gov. George Pataki and Judge Mary Donohue and the Democratic ticket of New York City Council Speaker Peter Vallone and Brighton Town Supervisor Sandra Frankel.

In 1996, she served on Governor Lamm's presidential committee and nominated him at the 1996 Reform Party's National Convention in Long Beach, California.

In 2009, she became the National Chairwoman to Support Popular Vote, a heavily-funded national lobbyist organization backed by Tom Golisano. Today she remains the closest and longest political advisor to Tom Golisano.
 
2002 Results for New York Governor and Lieutenant Governor
George Pataki and Mary Donohue (R-C) (inc.), 49%
Carl McCall and Dennis Mehiel (D-WF), 33%
Tom Golisano and Donohue (I), 14%

1998 Results for New York Governor and Lieutenant Governor
George Pataki and Mary Donohue (R-C) (inc.), 54%
Peter Vallone and Sandra Frankel (D-WF), 33%
Tom Golisano and Laureen Oliver (I), 8%
Betsy McCaughey Ross and Jonathan C. Reiter (L), 1.4%

1994 Race for New York Comptroller
Carl McCall (D-L), 45.15%
Herbert London (R-C-RTL), 40.48%
Laureen Oliver (I), 1%

References

Women in New York (state) politics
Year of birth missing (living people)
Living people
21st-century American women